"Leave (Get Out)" is the debut single of American singer JoJo from her self-titled debut studio album (2004). It was released as the album's lead single on February 24, 2004. Produced by Danish production duo Soulshock & Karlin, the song became a commercial success, reaching number 12 on the US Billboard Hot 100 and number two in the United Kingdom, Australia, New Zealand, and on the European Hot 100 Singles. It also reached the top five in Belgium, Ireland, the Netherlands, and Switzerland. The single was certified gold by the Recording Industry Association of America (RIAA) on October 25, 2004. When the single reached number one on Billboards Pop Songs chart, JoJo became, at age 13, the youngest female solo artist to have a number-one single in the United States. The song appears in the 2004 PlayStation 2 karaoke game Karaoke Revolution Volume 3 and Singstar Pop Hits.

Background and composition
"Leave (Get Out)" was written by Soulshock, Kenneth Karlin, Alex Cantrell and Phillip "Whitey" White of the Trackheads. Production and arrangement were helmed by Soulshock & Karlin. The song was recorded at Soulpower Studios and Westlake Studios in Los Angeles, California. Soulshock also mixed the song at Soulpower Studios and provided all the instruments with Karlin. The guitars, however, were performed by Eric Jackson and Sean Hurley. "Leave (Get Out)" was released as JoJo's debut single on February 24, 2004, through Blackground Records, via digital download and physical single. The single released in the United States included the song and a b-side, "Not That Kinda Girl". On June 21, 2004, the song was released to European markets in CD and maxi-single formats. The song was released in the United Kingdom and Ireland on August 30, 2004, as a CD single and digital download.

"Leave (Get Out)" is a pop and R&B song that has a length of four minutes and two seconds. According to the digital music sheet published at Musicnotes.com by EMI Music Publishing, the song is written in a key of D minor. The song has a moderate groove in common time with a tempo of 87 beats per minute. It follows a basic sequence of Gm7-Dm11-C-B♭(add9) as its chord progression. JoJo's vocals range from a F3 to a G5. Lyrically, "Leave (Get Out)" is about declaring independence.

During Sessions@AOL, JoJo said, "'Leave (Get Out)' is basically a song for all girls just to declare their independence because, as I'm sure all females can relate to, boys will be boys at any age and they don’t always act right. I'm not hating on the guys, but they just need to be kept in line every once in a while."

Critical reception
Johnny Loftus of AllMusic noted "Leave (Get Out)" as one of the album's top tracks, writing that it "doesn't have a lot of staying power, but its guitar figure is a nice touch, and the chorus hits with the right amount of tell-off brashness." Emma Morgan of Yahoo! Music UK called it her signature song, saying that it would be "strong enough" to base a music career on, but commented that she has no identity beyond this.

Chart performance
"Leave (Get Out)" proved to be successful in the North American territories. In the United States, the song entered the Billboard Hot 100 at number 99 on April 10, 2004. The song made gradual movements up the chart, reaching the peak of number 12 on the issue dated July 31, 2004, 16 weeks after its debut. It lasted 12 more weeks on the Hot 100 and sold over 500,000 downloads, earning a gold certification by the Recording Industry Association of America (RIAA). Aside from the Hot 100, "Leave (Get Out)" managed to peak at the summit of the US Billboard Pop Songs for five consecutive weeks. It also managed to peak at number 33 on the Billboard Adult Pop Songs.

"Leave (Get Out)" became an international success, reaching top five peaks in several European and Oceanic territories. The song peaked highest in Australia, New Zealand and the United Kingdom, all at number two. In Australia, the song debuted at its peak position and lasted on the singles chart for 15 weeks, eventually shipping 75,000 units to the country and earning a platinum certification by the Australian Recording Industry Association (ARIA). In New Zealand, however, the song entered the singles chart at number 36. It gained momentum in its second week, moving up to number five, earning the title of the week's "Greatest Gainer". The song stalled there for three weeks and reached its peak position two weeks after, on October 18, 2004. The song shipped 7,500 copies to New Zealand, earning a gold certification by the Recording Industry Association of New Zealand (RIANZ).

In the United Kingdom, "Leave (Get Out)" debuted and peaked at number two on the UK Singles Chart on September 5, 2004 - for the week ending date September 11, 2004 - beaten to number one by Nelly's "My Place". The song lasted in the top ten for four more weeks and fell to number 21 on the following week. The song quickly exited the UK Singles Chart, after two more weeks of descending the chart. "Leave (Get Out)" debuted on the Irish Singles Chart on September 2, 2004, at number eight. It peaked at number three two weeks later on September 16, 2004, moving from number seven and earning the title of the week's "Greatest Gainer". The song stalled at its peak position for three weeks and exited the chart two weeks later.

Music video
The music video, directed by Erik White and choreographed by Laurie Ann Gibson, takes place in a high school in California. JoJo is seen with friends in the yard, corridor and girls' bathroom. She is also seen dancing with cheerleading girlfriends, including pictures hanging on the walls with her alleged ex-boyfriend. It received heavy rotation on MTV, BET, VH1, Disney Channel and Nickelodeon. The video was nominated for Best New Artist at the 2004 MTV Video Music Awards, which made JoJo become the youngest MTV Video Music Award nominee. The video also retired on MTV's Total Request Live after spending 50 days on the countdown, including two days at  1, making her the youngest artist to both have a video retired and reach the summit of the chart.

Other versions
In December 2018, JoJo released a re-recorded version of "Leave (Get Out)" featuring reworked vocals and production. JoJo re-recorded the song, as well as her albums JoJo and The High Road, following a dispute with Blackground Records, which blocked the song from streaming services.

On March 19, 2020, JoJo uploaded a video of her singing from home a new quarantine-themed version of the song, titled "Chill (Stay In)", which featured updated lyrics encouraging self-isolation and social distancing during the COVID-19 pandemic. JoJo appeared on Tori Kelly's "QuaranTea with Tori" Instagram livestream where they performed the song together (with Kelly changing the swear words) on March 23.

Track listings

 US digital EP
 "Leave (Get Out)" (radio edit) – 4:02
 "Leave (Get Out)" (hip hop club mix) – 3:54
 "Leave (Get Out)" (dance mix) – 3:57
 "Leave (Get Out)" (instrumental) – 4:03

 US CD single and Australian CD 1
 "Leave (Get Out)" (album version) – 4:03
 "Leave (Get Out)" (hip hop club mix) – 3:50
 "Leave (Get Out)" (dance mix) – 3:54
 "Leave (Get Out)" (main instrumental) – 4:04
 "Not That Kinda Girl" – 3:28

 Australian CD 2
 "Leave (Get Out)" (radio edit) – 4:00
 "Leave (Get Out)" (album version) – 4:03
 "Leave (Get Out)" (hip hop club mix) – 3:50
 "Leave (Get Out)" (dance mix) – 3:54
 "Leave (Get Out)" (video—Disney/Nickelodeon version)

 UK CD1
 "Leave (Get Out)" (radio edit) – 4:00
 "Leave (Get Out)" (dance mix) – 3:54

 UK CD2
 "Leave (Get Out)" (radio edit) – 4:00
 "Leave (Get Out)" (hip hop club mix) – 3:50
 "Not That Kinda Girl" – 3:28
 "Leave (Get Out)" (video) – 4:00

 European CD single
 "Leave (Get Out)" (radio edit) – 3:49
 "Leave (Get Out)" (hip hop club mix) – 3:50

 European maxi-CD single
 "Leave (Get Out)" (radio edit) – 3:49
 "Leave (Get Out)" (hip hop club mix) – 3:50
 "Leave (Get Out)" (dance mix) – 3:54
 "Leave (Get Out)" (instrumental) – 4:04

Credits and personnel
Credits are adapted from the liner notes of the "Leave (Get Out)" European CD single.

Recording
 Recorded at Soulpower Studios (Los Angeles, California) and Westlake Studios (West Hollywood, California)
 Mixed at Soulpower Studios (Los Angeles, California)
 Mastered at Sony Studios (New York City, New York)

Personnel
 JoJo – vocals
 Soulshock & Karlin – production, arrangements, all instruments
 Soulshock – mixing
 Eric Jackson – guitar
 Sean Hurley – guitar
 James Cruz – mastering

Charts

Weekly charts

Year-end charts

Certifications

Release history

References

2004 debut singles
2004 songs
Contemporary R&B ballads
JoJo (singer) songs
Music videos directed by Erik White
Number-one singles in Scotland
Pop ballads
Song recordings produced by Soulshock and Karlin
Songs written by Kenneth Karlin
Songs written by Soulshock